Mosconi  is an Italian restaurant located at 13 rue Munster in the Grund district of Luxembourg City, Luxembourg, overlooking the river Alzette. Headed by chef Illario Mosconi, formerly from Lombardy, Italy, it is one of the Relais & Châteaux series of hotels and gourmet restaurants from around the world. The menu is an eight-course set menu of pasta dishes prepared with most of the ingredients imported from Italy. Mosconi became the first Italian restaurant to receive a Michelin star in Benelux. For a time, it had two Michelin stars but reverted to just one again in the guide for 2014.

Background
Born in Ponte di Legno near Brescia, and now in his mid-50s, Mosconi moved to Luxembourg with his parents when he was 13. His first experience in the restaurant business was as a waiter in Esch-sur-Alzette. When he opened his first restaurant, the Domus, also in Esch, he and his wife Simonetta worked in the dining room, not in the kitchen. But when almost 30, he realized his ambition of creating dishes of his own. He decided to take courses and work as a trainee with Gualtiero Marchesi at the Via Bonvesin de la Riva restaurant in Milan. There, he learned the art of cooking and the importance of selecting the very best produce available, leading him to import 90 per cent of his ingredients from Italy. This led to a Michelin star for the Domus in 1997, then to a first star at Mosconi in 2000, followed by a second in 2005. The restaurant is located near an old stone bridge. It offers a south-facing sitting terrace with a view of the Alzette.

Reception
The restaurant is highly acclaimed internationally and has a Michelin star in the "Bib Gourmand" category for 2014. Illario Mosconi was one of the first chefs to gain the distinction for an Italian restaurant outside of Italy. Michelin describes the food as "Italian cuisine full of panache, a firework of flavors!". Fodor's stated that it was "arguably the best in the Grand Duchy", with "delightful creations prepared by head chef Ilario Mosconi [which] are not just the best Italian dishes you will taste in Luxembourg, they are among the finest you will encounter anywhere outside Italy." Tim Skelton of Bradt Travel Guides says Illario "has an exquisite lightness of touch, meaning you can savour multiple courses without feeling stuffed," and he also notes that the tuna ice cream specialty is more palatable than it sounds. Simonetta Mosconi, Illario's wife, attends to the management of the restaurant. Beef from Tuscany, veal from the Piedmont, tomatoes from Sicily, and white truffles from Alba, combined with basil and ricotta, make the pasta dishes a unique experience.

See also
 List of Italian restaurants

References

External links
Official site

Restaurants in Luxembourg
Buildings and structures in Luxembourg City
Italian restaurants
Michelin Guide starred restaurants in Luxembourg
Pasta industry